The Lane Transit District (LTD) is a public agency that provides public transportation in Lane County, Oregon, United States. The transit district serves the Eugene and Springfield metropolitan areas, including the neighboring cities of Coburg, Junction City, Creswell, Cottage Grove, Veneta, and Lowell. LTD began service in 1970 with 18 buses and two vans, and today carries roughly 10.5 million customers annually with a fleet of 111 buses. Many of LTD's riders are students; University of Oregon and Lane Community College students ride by simply showing their student I.D.  Student fees subsidize both programs, as well as limited late-night service until about 1 a.m.

A board of directors, whose members are appointed by the Governor of Oregon, governs LTD. A combination of passenger fares, payroll taxes, and state and federal money fund the system.

According to LTD's Website, LTD operates 111 buses, which includes both standard and low-floor buses, in length of 30-foot, 40-foot, and 60-foot (articulated buses) for regular services. Among those 111 vehicles, 11 of those are the 60-foot BRT vehicles used for EmX service. All LTD buses are wheelchair-accessible, since 1985. The district currently operates 45 hybrid-electric buses, and 11 electric buses.

Climate Policy and Fleet Electrification 

In March 2020, LTD passed its first-ever board-level climate policy, with a commitment to reduce emissions from the fleet by 75% by 2030 and by 100% by 2035. Additionally, the policy calls for working with local jurisdictions to create joint goals related to the intersection of transportation and land use.

The agency took delivery of the first of eleven electric buses from New Flyer in December 2020, with the remainder scheduled to arrive in the first half of 2021.

EmX (Bus Rapid Transit in Eugene) 

In addition to the fixed bus routes, LTD operates a bus rapid transit line from downtown Eugene to the Gateway area in north Springfield, via downtown Springfield. The BRT line, named the Emerald Express (EmX), began operations in January 2007. The first corridor connects downtown Eugene to downtown Springfield and runs primarily along Franklin Boulevard. A second EmX corridor, the Gateway EmX extension, began service in January 2011. The Gateway EmX extension connects downtown Springfield and the Gateway area in north Springfield. LTD chose bus rapid transit after a review process during which several transportation options, including light rail, were considered. It concluded that this was the best option for Eugene-Springfield's size and current transportation needs.

The West Eugene Extension is a 17-station extension of the existing EmX service west from its existing terminus at Eugene Station in downtown Eugene. The extension opened on September 17, 2017. The addition added 4.4 miles to EmX's current line, while also adding a new bike lane, two new bike and pedestrian bridges, and 4.7 miles of new, wider sidewalks installed along West 6th, 7th, and 11th Avenues.

Route list 
(Information as of September 2022)

Former Routes

References

External links 

Bus transportation in Oregon
Bus rapid transit in Oregon
Transportation in Eugene, Oregon
Cottage Grove, Oregon
Transportation in Lane County, Oregon
Transit agencies in Oregon
1970 establishments in Oregon
Creswell, Oregon